Hilda Esthela Flores Escalera (born 9 September 1970) is a Mexican politician affiliated with the PRI. She currently serves as Senator of the LXII Legislature of the Mexican Congress. She also served as deputy during the LXI Legislature.

References

1970 births
Living people
Politicians from Saltillo
Members of the Chamber of Deputies (Mexico)
Members of the Senate of the Republic (Mexico)
Institutional Revolutionary Party politicians
21st-century Mexican politicians
21st-century Mexican women politicians
Members of the Congress of Coahuila
Deputies of the LXI Legislature of Mexico
Women members of the Senate of the Republic (Mexico)
Women members of the Chamber of Deputies (Mexico)